KWCK-FM is a radio station airing a country music format licensed to Searcy, Arkansas, broadcasting on 99.9 MHz FM.  The station serves the areas of Searcy, Arkansas, Heber Springs, Arkansas, Batesville, Arkansas, and Mountain View, Arkansas, and is owned by Crain Media Group, LLC.

References

External links
KWCK-FM's official website

Country radio stations in the United States
WCK-FM